Carlos Costa was the defending champion, but lost in the first round this year.

Thomas Muster won the tournament, beating Albert Costa in the final, 6–4, 6–2.

Seeds

Draw

Finals

Top half

Bottom half

External links
 Main draw

Portugal Open
1995 ATP Tour
Estoril Open